Marc Thuet (born 1963) is a chef based in Toronto, Ontario, Canada, who most recently appeared in his second season of a docu-reality TV series called Conviction Kitchen in which he trains 12 ex-cons to run a restaurant in Toronto.

Life and career
Born in Alsace, France, Thuet is a fourth-generation chef who began his apprenticeship in his uncle's restaurant at age twelve.  He received his formal training at the Lycée Hotelier in Strasbourg, France.

During his early professional years, Thuet worked in two and three star Michelin restaurants and hotels across Europe, including London's Dorchester under the tutelage of chef Anton Mosimann.

Thuet has headed the kitchen of many Toronto restaurants. In addition to being the executive chef of Petite Thuet, Atelier Thuet, and Bite Me!, he also opened a series of retail shops and a wholesale bakery.

Known for his use of locally grown produce purchased at local farmers markets, Thuet also travels to local Mennonite farms to purchase and butcher naturally-raised animals.

A cookbook by Thuet entitled French Food My Way was published in October 2010 by Penguin Publishing.

Work history 

2008 – Present:  Petite Thuet – Toronto, Chef
2009–2010:  Conviction Restaurant – Toronto, Chef 
2007–2009: Atelier Thuet – Toronto, Chef 
2008–2009: Bite Me! – Toronto, Chef 
2005–2008: Bistro & Bakery Thuet – Toronto, Chef
2004–2004: Rosewater Supper Club – Toronto, Consulting Chef
2002–2004: The Fifth – Toronto, Executive Chef
1993–2002: Centro – Toronto, Co-owner, Executive Chef
1989–1993: Centro – Toronto, Sous Chef
1986–1989: Windsor Arms Hotel Courtyard Café; Three Small Rooms – Toronto, Executive Sous Chef
1984–1985: Harbour Castle Hilton – Toronto, Chef de Partie
1982–1983: The Dorchester Terrace Dining Room – London (England), Apprentice/Commis

Education 
Restaurant Management, École Hôtelière, Strasbourg (France) (1980)

See also
Cuisine of Toronto
King Street (Toronto)

References

External links 
 Main Business Website
 Petite Thuet Website
 Marc Thuet at the Chef and Restaurant Database

1963 births
French chefs
Living people
People from Alsace
Participants in Canadian reality television series
Canadian television chefs
Canadian restaurateurs
Canadian male chefs